Below are the squads for the Football at the 1997 Mediterranean Games, hosted in Bari, Italy, and took place between 8 and 25 June 1997. Teams were national U-23 sides.

Group A

Algeria
Head coach: Mustapha Aksouh

Libya

Slovenia
Head coach: Drago Kostanjšek

Turkey
Head coach:  Cem Pamiroğlu

Group B

Albania

Italy
Head coach: Marco Tardelli

FR Yugoslavia
Head coach: Milan Živadinović

Group C

France
Head coach: Raymond Domenech

Greece
Head coach: Ioannis Kollias

San Marino

Group D

Bosnia and Herzegovina
Head coach: Besim Šabić

Croatia
Head coach: Ivo Šušak

Spain
Head coach: Javier Clemente

References

Sports at the 1997 Mediterranean Games
Mediterranean Games football squads